The Jacaré-Pepira River is a river of São Paulo state in southeastern Brazil. It flows into the Tietê River near Ibitinga.

See also
List of rivers of São Paulo

References

Brazilian Ministry of Transport

Rivers of São Paulo (state)
Tributaries of the Tietê